The Visakhapatnam–Secunderabad Duronto Express is a superfast AC express train of the Indian Railways, announced in 2011-12 Railway Budget by Mamata Banerjee, the then Minister of Indian Railways, connecting Secunderabad (SC) to Visakhapatnam (VSKP). It is the fastest way between the two cities and will consist of 18 coaches. On 30 June 2012, the Indian Railways announced that the train will be flagged of on 6 July. It was however flagged off from Visakhapatnam on 12 July 2012.

Overview
It is the 2nd fastest train between the two cities. The train has a commercial stops at Vijayawada Junction and Guntur Junction. From Oct 1st 2021 it is diverted via Guntur Junction to increase the connectivity between Guntur and Vishakapatnam.

Time Table

Coach and Rake
CC;- 1AC—1, 2AC—3, 3AC—11, EOG—2 total 18 LHB Coaches.
This train is Pulled by Lallaguda WAP-7
This train has No RSA. Single Dedicated Rake. PM @ SC/SCR

See also
Duronto Express
Godavari Express
Secunderabad Vishakhapatnam Garib Rath Express
Visakha Express
Secunderabad Mumbai Duronto Express
Secunderabad New Delhi Duronto Express
Secunderabad Railway Station

References

Transport in Visakhapatnam
Transport in Secunderabad
Duronto Express trains
Rail transport in Andhra Pradesh
Rail transport in Telangana